Đorđe Milić (also transliterated Djordje Milić; ; born October 27, 1943) is Yugoslav professional football manager and former player.

Career
He played for FK Vojvodina and Red Star Belgrade before moving to the Nederlands to play in FC Utrecht and afterwards to Turkey to play for Adanaspor and Beşiktaş in the early 1970s. Later, he became manager for two seasons at Adanaspor. Between 1980 and 1983, he was in charge of Beşiktaş.

International
He played one match for the Yugoslav national team in 1964, in a friendly against Romania.

Honours
Player

FK Vojvodina
Yugoslav First League: 1965-66
Beşiktaş
Turkish Cup: 1975

Manager

Beşiktaş
Turkish First Football League: 1981-82

External links
 
 
 
 
 Dorde Milic manager stats at Mackolik.com 

1943 births
Living people
Footballers from Belgrade
Yugoslav footballers
Serbian footballers
Association football forwards
FK Vojvodina players
Red Star Belgrade footballers
FC Utrecht players
Adanaspor footballers
Beşiktaş J.K. footballers
Yugoslav First League players
Eredivisie players
Süper Lig players
Yugoslavia international footballers
Yugoslav expatriate footballers
Yugoslav expatriate sportspeople in the Netherlands
Yugoslav expatriate sportspeople in Turkey
Expatriate footballers in the Netherlands
Expatriate footballers in Turkey
Yugoslav football managers
Serbian football managers
Beşiktaş J.K. managers
Bursaspor managers
Adanaspor managers
Süper Lig managers
Yugoslav expatriate football managers
Expatriate football managers in Turkey